Hoseynabad-e Eqbal (also Romanized as Ḩoseynābād-e Eqbāl) is a village in Eqbal-e Gharbi Rural District, in the Central District of Qazvin County, Qazvin Province, Iran. At the 2006 census, its population was 85, in 25 families.

References 

Populated places in Qazvin County